Face Up was a Catholic magazine targeted at teenagers published by Redemptorist Communications, which was administered by the Redemptorists of Ireland. It existed between February 2001 and April 2014.

History and profile
The magazine began in February 2001 and was published monthly. It was aimed at readers ages 15–18. Its slogan was "for teens who want something deeper". Each magazine had a distribution of approximately 13,000 copies and a readership of 40,000.

Face Up ceased publication in April 2014 due to low readership.

Editorial stance
In keeping with its Redemptorist background, the magazine advocated an active Christian ethos. Issues raised included career choices, how to handle bullying, loneliness, and making life-enhancing decisions. Face Up worked in partnership with other agencies seeking to support young people. In 2001, Deborah Grant of the Irish Independent described it as a "modest and smut-free teen publication", but not "overtly Christian or preachy". She questioned whether it would appeal to young people, as in her view it lacked "glamour and hot celebrity scoops".

References

External links
 Official website
 Publishers' website
 Ireland Redemptorists

Catholic magazines
Defunct magazines published in Ireland
Magazines established in 2001
Magazines disestablished in 2014
Monthly magazines published in Ireland
Religious works for children
Religious magazines
Teen magazines